

Survivors

Solomon Islands

On display
F4F-4
12068 - displayed unrestored at the Vilu War Museum in Honiara.

United Kingdom

Airworthy
FM-2
86690 - Restored to flight in 2022 by the Aircraft Restoration Company at Imperial War Museum Duxford.
86711 - The Fighter Collection in Imperial War Museum Duxford.
On display
Martlet I (F4F-3)
AL246 – Fleet Air Arm Museum in RNAS Yeovilton.
Under restoration
FM-1
JV482 - for display at the Ulster Aviation Society (Long Kesh Hangar), Lisburn, Northern Ireland.

United States
Airworthy
F4F-3
12260 - based at Lewis Air Legends in San Antonio, Texas. As of August 2021, it was on loan to the EAA Aviation Museum in Oshkosh, Wisconsin.
FM-2
16203 - privately owned in Wilmington, Delaware.
47030 - based at Military Aviation Museum in Virginia Beach, Virginia.
47160 - privately owned in Lewes, Delaware.
55627 - based at Palm Springs Air Museum in Palm Springs, California.
74560 - privately owned in Houston, Texas.
86564 - based at Yanks Air Museum in Chino, California.
86572 - based at Mid America Flight Museum in Mount Pleasant, Texas.

86680 - based at Collings Foundation in Stow, Massachusetts. unique in having a passenger cabin.  It is shown to be able to carry 4 passengers.
86741 - based at Fantasy of Flight in Polk City, Florida.
86746 - based at Frasca Air Museum in Champaign, Illinois.
86754 - based at Erickson Aircraft Collection in Madras, Oregon.
86774 - based at Fagen Fighters WWII Museum in Granite Falls, Minnesota.
86777 - based at Dakota Territory Air Museum in Minot, North Dakota.
86819 - based at Commemorative Air Force (Colonel Carter Teeters) in San Diego, California.
86956 - based at Cavanaugh Flight Museum in Addison, Texas.
On display
F4F-3
3872 - National Naval Aviation Museum at Naval Air Station Pensacola, Florida.
4039 - displayed unrestored in a simulated underwater diorama at the National Naval Aviation Museum at Naval Air Station Pensacola, Florida.
12290 - USS Midway Museum in San Diego, California.
12296 - Pacific Aviation Museum at Ford Island, Hawaii.
12297 - Cradle of Aviation Museum in Garden City, New York.  It is on loan from the National Naval Aviation Museum at Naval Air Station Pensacola, Florida.
12320 - Chicago O'Hare International Airport in Chicago, Illinois as a memorial to Navy Cross and Medal of Honor recipient and airport namesake, LCDR Edward O'Hare.  It is on loan from the National Naval Aviation Museum at Naval Air Station Pensacola, Florida.
F4F-3A
3956 - Patriots Point Naval Museum in Mount Pleasant, South Carolina.
3969 - National Naval Aviation Museum at Naval Air Station Pensacola, Florida.
F4F-4
11828 - San Diego Aerospace Museum in San Diego, California.  It is on loan from the National Naval Aviation Museum at Naval Air Station Pensacola, Florida.
12114 - National Museum of the Marine Corps in Triangle, Virginia.
FM-1
14994 - Valiant Air Command Warbird Museum at Space Coast Regional Airport in Titusville, Florida.  It is on loan from the National Naval Aviation Museum at Naval Air Station Pensacola, Florida.
15392 - National Air and Space Museum in Washington, D.C.
FM-2
16089 - National Naval Aviation Museum at Naval Air Station Pensacola, Florida.
16161 - Pima Air & Space Museum, adjacent to Davis-Monthan AFB, in Tucson, Arizona.
16278 - Hickory Aviation Museum, Hickory, North Carolina.
55052 -  at the former Naval Air Station Alameda in Alameda, California.
74120 - New England Air Museum, Windsor Locks, Connecticut.
74161 - National Museum of the Pacific War in Fredericksburg, Texas. It is on loan from the National Naval Aviation Museum at Naval Air Station Pensacola, Florida.
74512 - Museum of Flight in Seattle, Washington.
86581 - Air Zoo in Kalamazoo, Michigan.
86747 - National Naval Aviation Museum at Naval Air Station Pensacola, Florida.
Under restoration
FM-2
57039 - Restoration is being done by Kalamazoo Aviation History Museum in Kalamazoo, Michigan.  While conducting training on 28 December 1944, the FM2 Wildcat malfunctioned and rolled off the deck of the training aircraft carrier USS Sable. The pilot, ENS William Forbes, escaped from the aircraft before it sank into Lake Michigan. In early December 2012, the aircraft was moved 45 miles under the water to a safe harbor in Waukegan, Illinois. The Wildcat fighter was lifted from the water on Friday 7 December 2012.
86773 - to airworthiness by private owner in New London, Pennsylvania.

References

Notes

Grumman F4F Wildcats